Ekrem Bey Libohova (24 February 1882 – 7 June 1948) was an Albanian politician and Axis collaborator. He served as the Prime Minister of Albania on two occasions during the Italian occupation of Albania.

Political career
He was born in Gjirokastër and educated in Istanbul and Brussels. His brother was Mufid Libohova, who was Minister of the Interior in the Provisional Government of Albania.

Early in his political career, Libohova served as the Albanian Minister to Rome. In 1924, while serving in this role, Libohova helped negotiate the creation of the Bank of Albania. He was joined by his brother, Mufid.

In 1929, he became a minister of court to Zog I. Libohova was described as an "Italophile" by other members of Albania's political class during his time as minister to the court. On 26 January 1931, he joined King Zog on a trip to Italy. On 20 February, after attending a showing of Pagliacci at the Vienna State Opera, Libohova was injured in an assassination attempt against the King. Zog, Libohova, and their chauffeur returned fire on the attempted assassins, Aziz Çami and Ndok Gjeloshi. Libohova was shot in the leg and a bullet went through his hat; the King was unharmed.

During the 1936-1939 government of Kostaq Kotta, Libohova was Albania's foreign minister.  After the Italian invasion of Albania, he left the country for Italy but returned to serve in the government of the Italian protectorate. From January 19 to February 13, 1943, and from May 12 to September 8, 1943, Libohova served as Prime Minister.

As Germany invaded Albania to replace the Italians, Libohova and Italian General Alberto Pariani escaped for Italy. Libohova died in Rome on 7 June 1948.

References

1882 births
1948 deaths
People from Gjirokastër
People from Janina vilayet
Albanian Fascist Party politicians
Government ministers of Albania
Prime Ministers of Albania
State auditors of Albania
Members of the Chamber of Fasces and Corporations
Albanian collaborators with Fascist Italy
Albanian fascists
Ambassadors of Albania to Italy
Ambassadors of Albania to France